The 1995 Monte Carlo Open was a men's tennis tournament played on outdoor clay courts and took place at the Monte Carlo Country Club in Roquebrune-Cap-Martin, France, near Monte Carlo, Monaco. The event was part of the ATP Championship Series, Single-Week of the 1995 ATP Tour. It was the 89th edition of the tournament and was held from 24 April through 30 April 1995. Ninth-seeded Thomas Muster won the singles title, his second title at the event after 1992. It was the closest Becker ever got to winning a clay court tournament, as he missed a match point on his own serve with a double-fault in the fourth-set tiebreaker.

Finals

Singles

 Thomas Muster defeated  Boris Becker, 4–6, 5–7, 6–1, 7–6(8–6), 6–0
 It was Muster's 4th singles title of the year, and 27th of his career.

Doubles

 Jacco Eltingh /  Paul Haarhuis defeated  Luis Lobo /  Javier Sánchez, 6–3, 6–4

References

External links
 
 ATP tournament profile
 ITF tournament edition detail

 
Monte Carlo Open
Monte-Carlo Masters
Monte Carlo Open
Monte Carlo Open
Monte